Robin Andrew Guthrie (born 4 January 1962) is a Scottish musician, songwriter, composer, record producer and audio engineer, best known as the co-founder of the alternative rock band Cocteau Twins. During his career Guthrie has performed guitar, bass guitar, keyboards, drums and other musical instruments, in addition to programming, sampling and sound processing.

Career
Following the break-up of Cocteau Twins in 1998, Guthrie released his first solo record, Imperial, in 2003 on Bella Union Records. Guthrie's next release, which was co-written with Harold Budd, was the film score for Gregg Araki's Mysterious Skin. The soundtrack was released in May 2005 by Commotion and consists of 15 complete songs based on the short pieces used in the film.

In 2006, Guthrie signed a four-album solo deal with Darla Records, the first product of which was the album Continental. In February 2007, American webzine Somewhere Cold voted Continental best album of 2006, on their 2006 Somewhere Cold Awards Hall of Fame, and ranked Guthrie Artist of the Year. He subsequently released two four-track EPs, Everlasting and Waiting for Dawn.

Two more collaborations with Harold Budd (who had previously announced his musical retirement) were released simultaneously in 2007. After the Night Falls and Before the Day Breaks were both co-composed, co-produced and played with Budd. Like the soundtrack to Mysterious Skin, both albums are slow, drifting pieces primarily utilising treated guitar and piano.

Guthrie has also collaborated with singer Siobhan de Maré (formerly of Mono) as the band Violet Indiana.  Their first full-length album, Roulette, was released in 2001. A second album, Russian Doll, followed in 2004. In March 2006 Guthrie reported on his weblog that the group had started work again on new material.

In May 2009, Mirrorball, an album-length collaboration between Guthrie and John Foxx was released on Metamatic Records.

A new solo album, Carousel, was released via Rocket Girl in Europe on 1 September 2009 and Darla Records on 15 September 2009. Additionally, Guthrie issued the Angel Falls EP in early 2009, and the Songs to Help My Children Sleep EP in October 2009. A further EP Sunflower Stories was released in March 2010

Guthrie's most recent releases are Emeralds (2011) and two collaboration albums with Harold Budd, Bordeaux and Winter Garden (with Eraldo Bernocchi) (both 2011).

He played guitar on the Telefon Tel Aviv track "The Sky Is Black", from The Birds EP (2012). Guthrie released Fortune, his newest full-length album on 26 November 2012.

In 2015, Guthrie and friend Mark Gardener of Ride wrote, performed and recorded an album Universal Road together.

Guthrie currently tours live under the name "The Robin Guthrie Trio" consisting of himself, Steve Wheeler (on bass) & Antti Mäkinen (on drums). He works and lives in France with his wife Florence.

Recording and production work
In 1986, Robin Guthrie produced Felt's fourth studio album, Ignite the Seven Cannons, and the following year, he produced The Gun Club's fourth studio album, Mother Juno in Berlin. In 1990 he produced Lush's second EP Mad Love and a few other songs scattered on various compilation albums. He went on to produce their 1992 debut album Spooky and Black Spring EP (1991).

In 2005 Guthrie mixed Amber Smith's third studio album entitled RePRINT which brought the band an international breakthrough.

Discography

Studio albums (mainly solo)
Imperial (2003)
Continental (2006)
3:19 - Bande Originale Du Film (2008)
Carousel (2009)
Emeralds (2011)
Fortune (2012)
Pearldiving (2021)
Springtime - EP (2022)

References

External links

1962 births
20th-century Scottish male musicians
21st-century Scottish male musicians
4AD artists
Alternative rock bass guitarists
Alternative rock drummers
Alternative rock guitarists
Alternative rock keyboardists
Ambient musicians
British film score composers
British male film score composers
Cocteau Twins members
Fontana Records artists
Gothic rock musicians
Living people
People from Grangemouth
British post-punk musicians
Scottish audio engineers
Scottish bass guitarists
Scottish drummers
British male drummers
Scottish keyboardists
Scottish multi-instrumentalists
Scottish record producers
Scottish rock guitarists
Male bass guitarists
Scottish songwriters
Rocket Girl artists
Darla Records artists